Life by Misadventure is the second studio album by British singer and songwriter Rag'n'Bone Man. It was released on 7 May 2021 through Columbia Records and was preceded by two singles: "All You Ever Wanted" and "Anywhere Away from Here", a duet with American singer Pink. The album debuted at number one on the UK Albums Chart with sales of 42,000, including 33,000 on physical formats, making it the fastest-selling album by a solo artist in 2021.

Critical reception

Life by Misadventure has been given a Metacritic score of 62 based on eight reviews, indicating "generally favorable reviews". In a positive review, Clashs Josh Abraham noted that the "production is driven by a Motown style". However, it is not "afraid to get deep with a ballad or two". Kate Brayden at Hot Press opined that "Graham felt the need to maintain a safety net for the work, which has little experimentation" but still complimented his "unmatched vintage-meets-modern vocal talent". Narzra Ahmed of Line of Best Fit concluded that while "the first half of the album holds itself together so well", "the second half passes with little to no note". According to El Hunt at NME, "an artist obsessed with the idea of authenticity" is a trap Graham fell right into with the album.

Track listing
All tracks produced by Rag'n'Bone Man, Ben Jackson-Cook and Mike Elizondo, except for "Old Habits", which was produced without Elizondo.

PersonnelMusicians Rag'n'Bone Man – vocals (all tracks), guitar (14)
 Mike Elizondo – acoustic bass guitar (1), acoustic guitar (3, 10), bass (3), programming (3, 4, 6, 8, 11), synthesizer (3, 4, 6–9, 11), electric guitar (7–10, 13)
 Wendy Melvoin – acoustic guitar (1, 2, 6–13), electric guitar (3–7, 9, 11–13, 15), mandolin (10), ukulele (12)
 Desri Ramus – background vocals (1, 7, 10, 12–14)
 Sylvia Mwenze – background vocals (1, 7, 12–14)
 Daru Jones – drums (1, 3, 4, 6–13)
 Bill Banwell – electric guitar (1), bass (2–13, 15)
 Ben Jackson-Cook – piano (1, 3–7, 9, 11–15), programming (3, 4), synthesizer (3, 4)
 Peter Josef – background vocals (2–6, 9–13, 15)
 Peter Gregson – strings (2)Technical'
 Chris Gehringer – mastering
 Adam Hawkins – mixing (1–5, 7, 9–15)
 Jacquire King – mixing (6)
 Shawn Everett – mixing (8)
 Lawson White – engineering (1–13, 15)
 Jamie Sickora – engineering (1–7, 9–13, 15), engineering assistance (8)
 Jamie Tinsley – engineering (14)
 Erica Block – engineering assistance (1–13, 15)
 Zachary Stokes – engineering assistance (1–13, 15)
 Doug Clarke – engineering assistance (1–7, 9–)

Charts

Weekly charts

Year-end charts

Certifications

References

2021 albums
Columbia Records albums
Rag'n'Bone Man albums